Ourapteryx ramosa is a moth of the family Geometridae first described by Alfred Ernest Wileman in 1910. It is found in Taiwan.

References

Moths described in 1910
Ourapterygini